Oak Grove is a village in Rock Island County, Illinois, United States. The population was 396 at the 2010 census.

Geography

Oak Grove is located at  (41.413413, -90.569794).

Demographics

At the 2000 census there were 1,318 people, 109 households, and 61 families living in the village. The racial makeup of the village was 34.22% White, 57.74% African American, 0.53% Native American, 0.15% Asian, 7.36% from other races. Hispanic or Latino of any race were 8.65%.

Of the 109 households 23.9% had children under the age of 18 living with them, 33.0% were married couples living together, 13.8% had a female householder with no husband present, and 44.0% were non-families. 35.8% of households were one person and 4.6% were one person aged 65 or older. The average household size was 2.02 and the average family size was 2.49.

The age distribution was 3.2% under the age of 18, 17.7% from 18 to 24, 62.8% from 25 to 44, 14.3% from 45 to 64, and 2.0% 65 or older. The median age was 34 years. For every 100 females, there were 1,120.4 males. For every 100 females age 18 and over, there were 1,437.3 males.

The median household income was $30,833 and the median family income  was $36,667. Males had a median income of $12,259 versus $15,000 for females. The per capita income for the village was $15,045. About 10.6% of families and 13.3% of the population were below the poverty line, including 18.2% of those under age 18 and 12.8% of those age 65 or over.

References

Villages in Rock Island County, Illinois
Villages in Illinois
Cities in the Quad Cities